The Justice and Development Party is a Salafist political party in Tunisia.

References

Islamic political parties in Tunisia
Political parties in Tunisia
Political parties with year of establishment missing
Salafi Islamist groups
Sunni Islamic political parties